The Selborne Graving Dock is a dry dock in Simon's Town, South Africa.  It is situated within the Naval Base Simon's Town. It is named for William Palmer, 2nd Earl of Selborne, the High Commissioner for Southern Africa at the time of construction.

History
On , a tender for the construction of a yard was awarded to Sir John Jackson Ltd.  The construction used Portland cement from England, as well as granite blocks from Norway.

The Dockyard (including the dry dock) was handed to South Africa in 1957, as part of the Simonstown Agreement.

Images

References

Drydocks
Installations of the South African Navy
Buildings and structures in the Western Cape